Volleyball events were contested at the 1986 Central American and Caribbean Games in Santiago de los Caballeros, Dominican Republic.

References
 

1986 Central American and Caribbean Games
1986
1986 in volleyball
International volleyball competitions hosted by the Dominican Republic